Major-General Sir George Cooke  (bapt. 26 August 17663February 1837) was a British Army officer who commanded the 1st Division, under overall command of the Prince of Orange, at the Battle of Waterloo.

Early life and education
Cooke was the son and heir of George John Cooke of Harefield, MP for Middlesex, and Penelope Bowyer, daughter of Sir William Bowyer, 3rd Baronet of Denham Court.  His father, the son of George Cooke, descended from a line of prothonotaries of the Court of Common Pleas. Educated at Harrow and at the military school in Caen, Normandy, in 1784 Cooke was appointed an ensign in the 10th Grenadier Guards. His brothers were General Sir Henry Frederick Cooke and naval officer Edward Cooke while his sister was Penelope Anne "Kitty" Cooke.

After his father's death, his mother remarried Major-Gen. Edward Smith, uncle to Admiral Sir Sidney Smith.

Career
Cooke achieved his lieutenancy in 1792, followed shortly by his captaincy. 
In March 1794, he joined the Guards in Flanders and was appointed aide-de-camp to Major General Sir Samuel Hulse. 
He served throughout the French Revolutionary Wars, in Flanders and Holland, at the conclusion of which he was promoted to lieutenant-colonel of his regiment, despite being severely wounded in 1799. 
From 1803 until early 1805, he held the post of assistant adjutant-general of the north west district. 
After receiving the rank of brevet colonel in 1808, he participated in the ill-fated 1809 Schelde expedition. 
After posts in Cadiz, he went to Holland in 1813 with the Brigade of Guards and took part in the ill-fated Siege of Bergen op Zoom the following year where he was described as a "prudent and humane commander".

In 1815 was on Wellington's staff at the Battle of Waterloo, where he lost his right arm.
For his services at Waterloo he was made a Knight Commander of the Order of the Bath (KCB) on 22June 1815 and a Knight of St George of Russia.

He became Lieutenant-Governor of Portsmouth and General Officer Commanding South-West District in 1819.

He died, unmarried, at Harefield Park on 3February 1837.

Sources

Bibliography

Attribution

British Army major generals
British Army personnel of the French Revolutionary Wars
British Army personnel of the Napoleonic Wars
Knights Commander of the Order of the Bath
English amputees
Grenadier Guards officers
People educated at Harrow School
1837 deaths
1766 births
Recipients of the Waterloo Medal
Knights Third Class of the Military Order of William